Reza Sharbati (born February 16, 1995) is an Iranian footballer who plays for Iranian club Gol Gohar Sirnan as a left back.

Club career
Sharbati started his career with Siah Jamegan from youth levels. He made his professional debut for Siah Jamegan on August 13, 2015 in 1-0 win against Naft Tehran as a starter.

Club career statistics

References

External links
 Reza Sharbati at IranLeague.ir
 

1995 births
Living people
Sportspeople from Mashhad
Iranian footballers
Association football midfielders
Siah Jamegan players
Tractor S.C. players
Azadegan League players
Persian Gulf Pro League players
20th-century Iranian people
21st-century Iranian people